Fibiș is a commune in Timiș County, Romania. It is composed of a single village, Fibiș, part of the commune of Mașloc until 2004, when it was split off.

Geography 
Fibiș is located in the north of Timiș County, 30 km northeast of Timișoara, at the contact of the last extensions of the Lipova Plateau with the Timiș Plain. It borders Mașloc to the northeast, Remetea Mică to the east, Bencecu de Jos to the south, Pișchia to the southeast, Seceani to the west and Firiteaz and Fiscut (Arad County) to the northwest.

History 
The first recorded mention of Fibiș dates from 1234 (Fiues). However, Hungarian historian  claims that Fibiș was founded in 1380 on the hearth of a former village called Batriu. By 1446, when it was known as Fÿüves, Fibiș belonged to Arad District. At the 1717 census Fibiș had 20 houses. According to Hungarian historians Váli and Nagy, Fibiș was mostly Romanian during this period. Towards the end of the 19th century, several Hungarian and German families were settled here. Romanians had their own school since 1777, while the German school was built in 1891. Fibiș was bought in 1815 by Prince Karl Schwarzenberg, who sold it to Péter Tököly in 1819. In 1845 it became the property of Greek-Austrian banker Simon Sinas. Around 1940, Romanians and Germans mostly lived separately, and Hungarians were scattered among Romanians and Germans and the so-called Gyepsoron. Since 1989, many Romanian, Hungarian and German residents have left the village; the German community has virtually disappeared. Between 1967 and 2004 Fibiș belonged to the commune of Mașloc, then it became an independent commune.

Demographics 

Fibiș had a population of 1,590 inhabitants at the 2011 census, down 5% from the 2002 census. Most inhabitants are Romanians (91.89%), with a minority of Hungarians (3.52%). For 3.33% of the population, ethnicity is unknown. By religion, most inhabitants are Orthodox (87.04%), but there are also minorities of Greek Catholics (3.4%), Pentecostals (3.08%), Baptists (1.51%) and Roman Catholics (1.32%). For 3.33% of the population, religious affiliation is unknown.

References 

Communes in Timiș County
Localities in Romanian Banat
Former Danube Swabian communities in Romania